The 2000 Derby City Council election took place on 4 May 2000 to elect members of Derby City Council in England. One third of the council was up for election and the Labour party kept overall control of the council.

After the election, the composition of the council was
Labour 29
Conservative 9
Liberal Democrat 6

Election result

Ward results

Abbey

Babington

Chaddesden

Chellaston

Darley

Derwent

Kingsway

Litchurch

Littleover

Mackworth

Mickleover

Normanton

Osmanton

Sinfin

Spondon

References

2000 English local elections
2000
2000s in Derby